Felicità (Italian for Happiness) is a studio album by Italian duo Al Bano and Romina Power, released in 1982 by Baby Records. The album was an international commercial success and included two of their biggest hits, "Felicità" and "Sharazan".

In some territories, it was confusingly released under the title of their previous album, Aria pura, even though the two LPs contained different material.  The duo also recorded a Spanish language version of the album, Felicidad.

Track listing

Original Italian release
Side A
"Aria pura" – 3:12
"Felicità" – 3:13
"Prima notte d'amore" – 2:55
"Sharazan" – 4:45
"Il ballo del qua qua" – 2:52

Side B
"Angeli" – 3:25
"E fu subito amore" – 3:59
"Canto di libertà" – 2:45
"Caro Gesù" – 3:30
"Arrivederci a Bahia" – 3:02

Spanish release (Felicidad)
Side A
"Felicidad" – 3:13
"Nestra primera noche" – 2:55
"Canto de libertad" – 2:45
"Il ballo del qua qua" – 2:52
"Arrivederci en Bahia" – 3:02

Side B
"Aire puro" – 3:12
"Oye Jesús" – 3:30
"Vivirlo otra vez" – 3:59
"Angeles" – 3:25

Charts

Weekly charts

Year-end charts

References

1982 albums
Italian-language albums
Baby Records albums